The northern Indian state of Himachal Pradesh is divided into 12 districts, the Revenue department of which is headed by a Deputy Commissioner or District Magistrate, an officer belonging to the Indian Administrative Service. The district magistrate or the deputy commissioner is assisted by a number of officers belonging to Himachal Administrative Service and other Himachal state services.

A District Judge serves as the head of the Judiciary of the district. Courts subordinate to him include those of the Civil Judges, Senior Civil Judges, and Judicial Magistrates.

A Superintendent of Police, an officer belonging to the Indian Police Service is entrusted with the responsibility of maintaining law and order and related issues of the district. He is assisted by the officers of the Himachal Police Service and other Himachal Police officials.

A Deputy Conservator of Forests, an officer belonging to the Indian Forest Service is responsible for managing the Forests, environment and wild-life related issues of the district. He is assisted by the officers of the Himachal Forest Service and other Himachal Forest officials and Himachal Wild-Life officials.

Sectoral development is looked after by the district head of each development department such as PWD, Health, Education, Agriculture, Animal husbandry, etc. These officers belong to the various State Services.

List

References

External links 

Himachal Pradesh
Districts